The All-Ireland Senior Hurling Championship 1906 was the 20th series of the All-Ireland Senior Hurling Championship, Ireland's premier hurling knock-out competition.  Tipperary won the championship, beating Dublin 3-16 to 3-8 in the final.

Format

All-Ireland Championship

Quarter-final: (1 match) This is a lone match between the Leinster and Ulster representatives.  One team is eliminated at this stage while the winners advance to the semi-finals.

Semi-finals: (2 matches) The winners of the lone quarter-final join the Munster and Connacht representatives and London, who receive a bye to this stage of the championship, to make up the semi-final pairings.  Two teams are eliminated at this stage while the two winning teams advance to the All-Ireland final.

Final: (1 match) The winners of the two semi-finals contest this game with the winners being declared All-Ireland champions.

Results

Connacht Senior Hurling Championship

Leinster Senior Hurling Championship

Munster Senior Hurling Championship

Ulster Senior Hurling Championship

All-Ireland Senior Hurling Championship

References

Sources
 Corry, Eoghan, The GAA Book of Lists (Hodder Headline Ireland, 2005).
 Donegan, Des, The Complete Handbook of Gaelic Games (DBA Publications Limited, 2005).

1906